Turkmenistan competed at the 2004 Summer Paralympics in Athens, Greece. The team included four athletes, all of them men, and won no medals.

Sports

Powerlifting

See also
Turkmenistan at the Paralympics
Turkmenistan at the 2004 Summer Olympics

References 

Nations at the 2004 Summer Paralympics
2004
Summer Paralympics